Roger S. Fouts (born June 8, 1943) is a retired American primate researcher. He was co-founder and co-director of the Chimpanzee and Human Communication Institute (CHCI) in Washington, and a professor of psychology at the Central Washington University. He is best known for his role in teaching Washoe the chimpanzee to communicate using a set of signs taken from American sign language.

Fouts is an animal rights advocate, citing the New Zealand Animal Welfare Act as a model for legal rights for the Great Apes (Hominidae), and campaigning with British primatologist Jane Goodall for improved conditions for chimpanzees. He has written on animal law and on the ethics of animal testing. He is also an adviser to the Oxford Centre for Animal Ethics.

He is married to Deborah Fouts, who was the co-director and co-founder of CHCI.

Early life
Fouts was born in Sacramento, California. He received his B.A. in child psychology from the college that became California State University, Long Beach a few years later. In 1964, he married Deborah Harris, who  became his life-time collaborator. Fouts earned his Ph.D. from the University of Nevada, Reno.

Career
In 1967, Fouts' career took a decisive turn after it was almost derailed by a disastrous job interview with Dr. Allen Gardner in Reno, Nevada. However, Washoe, a chimpanzee, took an immediate liking to Roger, and leapt into his arms. A few days later he was told he had got the job. In 1970 the project with Washoe and the Gardners relocated to the Institute of Primate Studies in Norman, Oklahoma.

The Gardners and Fouts taught the chimpanzees signs from American Sign Language (ASL) by modeling (demonstration and getting the chimps to imitate) and physical prompting (directly manipulating the chimpanzees' hands into the required shapes). As the studies progressed, they found that the animals used ASL to communicate with each other. The apes created phrases from combinations of signs to denote new things that were brought into their environment. Loulis, Washoe's adopted son, learned basic ASL and over 70 signs directly from Washoe, without human involvement.

Fouts has been a consultant or adviser on four movies, including Greystoke: The Legend of Tarzan, Lord of the Apes (1984).

See also 
Animal testing
International primate trade
 List of animal rights advocates
Non-human primate experiments

Notes

Further reading 
 Roger Fouts at Central Washington University
 The Chimpanzee and Human Communication Institute
 Biography at Muskingum College History of Psychology Archives
 Fouts, Roger S. & Mills, Stephen Tukel (1997) Next of Kin: My Conversations with Chimpanzees, William Morrow. 
Fouts, Roger S. (1973) "Acquisition and testing of gestural signs in four young chimpanzees", 180 Science, pp. 978–980.

1943 births
American animal rights activists
American animal welfare scholars
Animal testing in the United States
California State University, Long Beach alumni
Central Washington University faculty
Living people
People involved with sign language
University of Nevada, Reno alumni